Football Crazy is a song about football first written in the 1880s, later recorded by Scots folk duo Robin Hall and Jimmie Macgregor.

Football Crazy may also refer to 

 "Football Crazy (The Goodies)", an episode of the Goodies.
L'arbitro (1974 film), an Italian film also released under the English title of Football Crazy.
 "Football Crazy", an episode of Taggart.
 Nokia Football Crazy, a sports programme on Asian Fox Sports broadcast between 2005 and 2011.